Dinarmus is a genus of wasps belonging to the family Pteromalidae.

The genus has almost cosmopolitan distribution.
Many species in this genus are parasitoids, and some species (such as D. basalis and D. vagabundus) are used in integrated pest management to prevent the destruction of cowpea crops by Callosobruchus larvae.

Species:

Dinarmus acutus 
Dinarmus altifrons 
Dinarmus basalis 
Dinarmus colemani 
Dinarmus garouae 
Dinarmus italicus 
Dinarmus ivorensis 
Dinarmus lamtoensis 
Dinarmus latialis 
Dinarmus maculatus 
Dinarmus magnus 
Dinarmus major 
Dinarmus parvula 
Dinarmus schwenkei 
Dinarmus simus 
Dinarmus steffani 
Dinarmus vagabundus 
Dinarmus yagouae

References

Pteromalidae